Natalya Deryugina (born April 23, 1971) is a Russian handball player who competed for the Unified Team in the 1992 Summer Olympics.

In 1992 she won the bronze medal with the Unified Team. She played all five matches and scored 14 goals.

External links
profile

1971 births
Living people
Russian female handball players
Olympic handball players of the Unified Team
Soviet female handball players
Handball players at the 1992 Summer Olympics
Olympic bronze medalists for the Unified Team
Olympic medalists in handball
Medalists at the 1992 Summer Olympics